The following table shows the 32 federal entities of Mexico, ranked in order by population growth from the 2020 to the 2010 National Census Population from the National Institute of Statistics and Geography.

See also
 Mexico
 States of Mexico
 Geography of Mexico
 List of Mexican states by population
 List of Mexican states by area
 Ranked list of Mexican states
 List of Mexican states by HDI
 List of Mexican states by GDP
 List of Mexican states by GDP per capita

References

Population
Mexico, population growth rate